Raid (German:Razzia) is a 1921 German silent film directed by Wolfgang Neff and featuring Maria Forescu and Willy Fritsch.

The film's sets were designed by the art director Mathieu Oostermann.

Cast
In alphabetical order
 Maria Forescu as Blanchette  
 Willy Fritsch as Heinrich  
 Walter Halde as Lucies Freund  
 Loo Hardy as Adele  
 Fred Immler as Fabrikant Hirtes  
 Walter Liedtke as Felix - ein Schuster  
 Lotte Paulsen as Lusie  
 Anna von Palen as Bettlerin

References

Bibliography
 Hans-Michael Bock and Tim Bergfelder. The Concise Cinegraph: An Encyclopedia of German Cinema. Berghahn Books.

External links

1921 films
Films of the Weimar Republic
Films directed by Wolfgang Neff
German silent feature films
German black-and-white films